Q-pop or Qazaq pop is a music genre originating in Kazakhstan. It is a modern form of Kazakhstani pop music sung in Kazakh, incorporating elements of Western pop music, Kazakhstani hip hop, EDM, R&B and Toi-pop, with heavy influences from K-pop of South Korea. The genre first surfaced in 2015 when the first Q-pop group, Ninety One debuted. Since then the genre has experienced growing popularity among Kazakhstani youths, with more Q-pop artists forming and debuting.

Background 

The term ‘Q-pop’ was coined in 2015 by Ninety one fans to distinguish Kazakh pop music from the rest of the world pop scene. One characteristic feature of ‘Q-pop’ is very clear: it is ‘Kazakhstan pop made in Kazakhstan by Kazakhstan musicians for a Kazakhstan audience and it dominates the Kazakhstan market. New popular culture phenomenon that is termed as a ‘Q-pop’ with ‘Q’ standing for Kazakhstan, and ‘Pop’ meaning popular music. ‘Q-pop’ singers do not use their real names instead they replace them with English ones. Finally, when they release new songs they name them in English wording (name of the songs, group members’ nicknames, fandom names, mixing English words and sounds with the Kazakh language).

Applying all western and non-western music elements into the Kazakhstan context, ‘Q-pop’ became sophisticated enough to satisfy even those who used to love western music. Here ‘Q-pop’ has the hybrid quality of western music, and response to, globalization and its consequent anxiety since the late 1990s. Its rising popularity in Kazakhstan market is derived from the globalization effect of ‘Q-pop’, thanks to the development of new technology within computers, internet and transportation, the expansion of tourism, and, most importantly, the consequent trans-nationalization of cultural tastes in the Central Asian region. ‘Q-pop’ entertainment companies work in a similar manner such as Korean entertainment labels. ‘Q-pop’ singers are young, with most of them being born after 1990 or even 2000, with bright fashion styles and colored hair with trendy haircuts. They can dance modern dances while singing and can put on great performances that attract thousands of young people.

Kazakhstan experienced the Korean Wave when South Korean dramas and movies started entering the country in the mid 2000s. This phenomenon, assisted by the increasing accessibility of the internet, sparked more interest in South Korean pop culture among Kazakhstanis, which helped the popularization of the K-pop music genre in Kazakhstan. K-pop is regarded as an attractive, less-restrictive and unique genre. The high popularity of K-pop in Kazakhstan spurred the creation of the first Q-pop project in 2014, when JUZ Entertainment formed Ninety One. After the group debuted in 2015, it became instantly popular among youth, due to its high quality music and the use of Kazakh in its songs.

Current status 
Q-pop is enjoying support from both the government and the people as a means to promote and popularize the use of Kazakh language and Latin script among youth. However, it has also faced criticism and rejection from the traditionalist element of society, especially toward its performers' on-stage appearance. Since 2018, there has been an annual q-pop music festival called the Q-Fest, usually held during Autumn in Almaty.

List of Q-pop performers

Boy bands 

10iz
DNA (disbanded)
ML
 (disbanded)
Ninety One
  (disbanded)
 (disbanded) 
Alien
Black Dial (disbanded)
Divine (disbanded)
Qarapaiym (disbanded)
Alpha 
BlackJack  
Warno

Girl groups 

Crystalz (disbanded)
Juzim (disbanded)
Ayanat (disbanded)
Ice Blue
Ozge (disbanded)
IMZ1
Qiyal (disbanded)
Oasis

Co-ed groups 

Youngsters

Musical duos 

The Egiz
Bope & Roo
Buira (disbanded)

Male soloists 

ASHAD (ex AJ)
Arsenaleen
AZ (ex Ninety One)
Bala (Ninety One)
Kyle Ruh (ex ML)
Madi Rymbaev
Qog
ZaQ (Ninety One)

Female soloists 

Alba
Ayree
C.C.TAY
Diuoou
Aroojeanne
Malika Yes
Polina Max
Ziruza

Crossover artists 
These artists also sing in genres besides Q-pop such as Toi, Hip-Hop & R&B

Aidana Medenova
Ali Oqapov
Beibit Koshqaliev
Daneliya Tuleshova
Dimash Kudaibergen
Erke Esmahan
Kamshat Joldybaeva
Nurbolat Abdullin
Qyandyq Rahym

List of Q-pop record labels and management agencies 

 C.C.Team Entertainment
 Dara Entertainment
 JUZ Entertainment
 D&D Production
 MM Entertainment
 Lion Pride Entertainment
 Trend Entertainment
 Musan Entertainment

References 

21st-century music genres
Kazakhstani popular music
Kazakhstani styles of music
Pop music by country
Pop music genres